The discography of the Greek contemporary instrumental musician Yanni includes 19 studio albums and eight live albums. In 1987 he put together a small band which included John Tesh and Charlie Adams, and began touring to promote his earliest instrumental albums, Keys to Imagination, Out of Silence, and Chameleon Days.

Dare to Dream was released in 1992. It was Yanni's first Grammy-nominated album and featured "Aria", a song based on The Flower Duet and popularized by an award-winning British Airways commercial. A second Grammy-nominated album, In My Time, was released in 1993. His music has been used extensively in television and televised sporting events, including the starting grids for the 1989, 1992, and 1994 Daytona 500s on CBS, Super Bowl, Wide World of Sports, U.S. Open, Tour de France, World Figure Skating Championships, The Olympics, and ABC News.

Yanni's breakthrough commercial success came with the release of his album and video, Live at the Acropolis, filmed on September 25, 1993 at the 2,000-year-old Herod Atticus Theater in Athens, Greece, and released in 1994. This was Yanni's first live album and utilized a full orchestra under the supervision of the Iranian conductor, Shahrdad Rohani, in addition to his core band. Subsequently, the concert was broadcast in the US on PBS and quickly became one of their most popular programs ever, having been seen in 65 countries by half a billion people.  A composition from this album, "Acroyali/Standing in Motion", was determined to have the "Mozart Effect," by the Journal of the Royal Society of Medicine because it is similar to Mozart's K 448 in tempo, structure, melodic and harmonic consonance and predictability.  He has appeared on several major PBS Pledge TV Specials such as A Decade of Excellence, including segments from Live at the Acropolis, Tribute, and Live at Royal Albert Hall, London.

Albums

Studio albums

1980s–1990s

2000s–2020s

Live albums

Charted compilations

Other compilations 
1992 Yanni Gift Set (Reflections of Passion/In Celebration of Life), Private Music
1993 My World in Music - The Collection, BMG 
1994 A Collection of Romantic Themes, Private Music
1997 Enraptured: A Collection of Yanni Favorites, BMG 
1997 Enchanted: Music from the Heart, BMG 
1997 Greatest Hits, BMG 
1998 A Peaceful Place, BMG 
1998 Sanctuary, BMG 
1999 The Endless Dream, Unison
1999 Someday, Unison
1999 Songs from the Heart, BMG International
1999 The Private Years, Private Music
2000 Soaring Free (Disk 1), Madacy Distribution
2000 Whispers in the Dark, BMG 
2002 Gold, BMG 
2006 The Collection, Private Music
2008 Collections, Sony BMG
2010 The Inspiring Journey, Sony Music Distribution
2013 Playlist: The Very Best of Yanni, Windham Hill Records

Soundtracks
1988 Steal the Sky
1988 Heart of Midnight
1989 I Love You Perfect
1990 Children of the Bride
1990 She'll Take Romance
1990 When You Remember Me
1994 Hua qi Shao Lin
2015 Hexi Corridor

Singles

2013 "East Meets West"
2015 "Seven Billion Dreams"
2018 "When Dreams Come True"
2018 "Speed Demon"
2019 "Ladyhawk"
2019 "Blue"
2019 "Into the Deep Blue"

Notes

References

External links

Discographies of Greek artists